The Opposition in Malaysia fulfils the same function as the official opposition in other Commonwealth of Nations monarchies. It is seen as the alternative government and the existing administration's main opponent at a general election.

Federal Parliament

This is the list of current Leaders of the Opposition in the Parliament of Malaysia:

State Legislative Assemblies

The Leader of the Opposition in Malaysian State Politics is a Member of the Legislative Assembly in the Dewan Undangan Negeri (State Legislative Assembly).

In each state, the Leader of the Opposition is the leader of the largest political party in the State Assembly that is not in government.

When in state legislative assembly, the Leader of the Opposition sits on the left-hand side of the centre table, in front of the Opposition and opposite the Menteri Besar/Chief Minister. The State Opposition Leader is elected by the minority party of the Assembly according to its rules. A new Opposition Leader may be elected when the incumbent dies, resigns, or is challenged for the leadership.

Malaysia is a constitutional monarchy with a parliamentary system and is based on the Westminster model. The Opposition is an important component of the Westminster system, with the Opposition directing criticism at the Government's policies and programs, give close attention to all proposed legislation and attempts to defeat and replace the Government. The Opposition is therefore known as the 'government in waiting' and it is a formal part of the parliamentary system.

This is the list of current Leaders of Opposition in the Legislative Assemblies of the Malaysian states:

References

 
Parliament of Malaysia
Malaysia
Malaysia